Vittorio Tomassetti (28 June 1930 – 6 January 2008) was the Italian Roman Catholic bishop emeritus of the Diocese of Fano-Fossombrone-Cagli-Pergola.  He was ordained a priest on 23 August 1953, and was later ordained a bishop on 28 June 1992 as the bishop of Palestrina, Italy.

External links
Catholic Hierarchy: Bishop Vittorio Tomassetti †
E' morto Vittorio Tomassetti, ex vescovo di Fano 

1930 births
2008 deaths
20th-century Italian Roman Catholic bishops